Pterolophia varipennis is a species of beetle in the family Cerambycidae. It was described by James Thomson in 1865.

References

varipennis
Beetles described in 1865